Aphrodisianus was a Persian man who wrote a description of the east in Greek, a fragment of which is given by the 17th century philologist Charles du Fresne, sieur du Cange. An extract from this work is said to exist in the royal library at Vienna (now the Austrian National Library).

Aphrodisianus also wrote a historical work on the Christian Mary.

Notes

Ancient Greek writers
Ancient Persian people